Urum al-Kubrah (also spelled Urem al-Kubra) is a town in western Aleppo Governorate, northwestern Syria. With a population of 5,391 as per the 2004 census, it is the administrative center of Nahiya Urum al-Kubrah in Atarib District. Located southwest of Aleppo,  Nearby localities include Atarib to the west, Awayjil to the north, Kafr Naha to the east, al-Radwan to the south and Urum al-Sughra to the southwest.

Syrian civil war

As of 2020, the town formed part of the frontline between forces of the Syrian Arab Army and the opposition group Hayat Tahrir al-Sham (HTS).

On 18 January 2023, as part of increasing attacks on the frontline, HTS militants attacked Syrian Army positions near the town, resulting in violent clashes. At least 5 Syrian soldiers and 3 HTS militants were killed in the clashes.

References

Populated places in Atarib District